William Duncan (29 December 1933 – 24 August 2008) was a New Zealand cricketer. He played in five first-class matches for Northern Districts in 1957/58.

See also
 List of Northern Districts representative cricketers

References

External links
 

1933 births
2008 deaths
New Zealand cricketers
Northern Districts cricketers
Cricketers from Christchurch